Dame Mary Drummond Corsar,  ( 
Buchanan-Smith; 8 July 1927 – 12 August 2020), was a Scottish activist and philanthropist. She was chairperson of the Women’s Royal Voluntary Service from 1988 to 1993 and noted for modernising the organisation. She is also noted for the role she played in coordinating the emergency response to the Lockerbie bombing. Corsar was appointed DBE in 1993.

She was born 8 July 1927, as Mary Drummond Buchanan-Smith, daughter of the Life-Peer Lord Balerno, soldier and geneticist, who was Deputy Chairman of the Unionist Party in Scotland 1960-63. Her mother was the former Mary Kathleen Smith. She died in 1947. The Scottish Conservative politician, Alick Buchanan-Smith, was her brother.

She married 25 April 1953, Colonel Charles Herbert Kenneth Corsar, LVO, OBE, TD (1926-2012), Vice Lord-Lieutenant of the District of Midlothian 1993-97, by whom she had issue, two sons and three daughters. She lived at Ulva Ferry
near Torloisk House, Isle of Mull.

References

1927 births
2020 deaths
Dames Commander of the Order of the British Empire
Daughters of life peers